The National Advancement Party is a conservative political party in Guatemala. It was founded in 1989.

In the 1990 and 1995 elections its presidential candidate was Álvaro Arzú who won in 1995, becoming Guatemala's 32nd president (1996–2000).
Óscar Berger ran as the party's presidential candidate in the 1999 Guatemalan General Election becoming the runner-up in 1999. After winning PAN’s presidential candidacy in late 2002, he was going to run as the party's presidential candidate in the 2003 Guatemalan General Election. However, internal divisions plagued the party and Óscar Berger decided to leave PAN and enter the second round of the 2003 presidential elections as the candidate for the Gran Alianza Nacional (GANA), an alliance of 3 parties including Partido Patriota (PP), Movimiento Reformador (MR) and Partido Solidaridad Nacional (PSN).

2003 election

At the 2003 elections, held on 9 November 2003, the party won 8.4% of the popular vote and 17 out of 158 seats in Congress. The party's presidential candidate, Leonel López Rodas, won 8.4% in the presidential elections held on the same day; duly eliminated, he did not compete in the second round.

2007 election

At the 2007 elections, the party was badly defeated, but still received representation in Congress with 4.58% of the vote and four seats. Its presidential candidate, Óscar Casteñeda, received 2.56% of the vote.

2011 election

In the 2011 Election, the party chose Juan Guillermo Gutiérrez as its presidential candidate. He came in seventh place with 2.76% of the vote. In the Legislative Election, the party won 1.27% of the vote and 2 seats in Congress.

2015 election

In the 2015 Election, the party again chose Juan Guillermo Gutiérrez  as its presidential candidate. He came in tenth place with 3.10% of the vote. In the Legislative Election, the party won 1.90% of the vote and 3 seats in Congress.

2019 election

In the 2019 Election, the party chose Roberto Arzú  as its presidential candidate. He came in fifth place with 6.10% of the vote. In the Legislative Election, the party won 1.25% of the vote and 2 seats in Congress.

After the elections, the party generally supported the government faction in Congress, voting in favor of the government proposed slate for the directorate of Congress in January 2020 and October 2021.

Election results

Congress of the Republic

President of the Republic of Guatemala

Notes

References

External links
PAN WEBSITE

1989 establishments in Guatemala
Conservative parties in Guatemala
International Democrat Union member parties
Political parties established in 1989
Nationalist parties in Guatemala
Protestantism in Guatemala
Protestant political parties